This is a list of all buildings in Finland with a height of over 60 metres (197 feet), excluding churches.

For other types of tall structures in Finland, see List of tallest structures in Finland.
Näsinneula is 135m but may not be considered a building

Current tallest buildings

Tallest proposed, approved or under construction

References

Finland
Landmarks in Finland
Tallest
Finland